Hugo Gressmann (21 March 1877 – 6 April 1927) was a prominent Old Testament scholar in Protestant Germany and a friend and associate of the eminent scholar Hermann Gunkel. He was a member of the history of religions school.

Early life
He was born on 21 March 1877 in Mölln, in the Province of Schleswig-Holstein.

Gattungsgeschichte method
Gressmann carried over the work of Gunkel in which he used the Gattungsgeschichte method of Biblical study (otherwise known as Form Criticism) and applied it to the books of Exodus, Joshua, Judges, Ruth, 1 & 2 Samuel and 1 & 2 Kings, in the Old Testament.

He took a traditio-historical approach in examining these passages, aiming to examine individual units so as to glean from them their original setting and purpose.

Conflict with the ideas of Wellhausen
Gressmann was significant in that he disagreed with the ideas of Julius Wellhausen, another eminent Biblical scholar, on the dates of the Decalogue (more commonly known as the Ten Commandments). Whereas Wellhausen placed the date at a relatively late stage in the history of Israel, Gressmann argued that, as they bore no evidence of having been influenced by Canaan, they must have been composed at a far earlier stage in Israel's history. Furthermore, he argued that they were older than the Prophets.

Death
Gressmann died on 6 April 1927 in Chicago.

References 

'

1877 births
1927 deaths
People from Mölln, Schleswig-Holstein
People from the Province of Schleswig-Holstein
19th-century German Protestant theologians
20th-century German Protestant theologians
German biblical scholars
Old Testament scholars
19th-century German male writers
German male non-fiction writers